Needmore is an unincorporated community and census-designated place (CDP) in Fulton County, Pennsylvania, United States. As of the 2010 census, the population was 170. Needmore was created on April 27, 1954.

Geography
Needmore is in south-central Fulton County, at the intersection of U.S. Route 522 (Great Cove Road) and Route 655 (Thompson Road) in Belfast Township. US 522 leads south  to Interstate 70 at Warfordsburg and northeast  to McConnellsburg, the Fulton County seat. PA 655 leads south  to the Maryland border (the Mason–Dixon line).

The community is located in the valley of Tonoloway Creek, a southward-flowing tributary of the Potomac River. The north end of Tonoloway Ridge rises just south of Needmore.

Demographics

Geology
The Devonian geologic formation called the Needmore Formation is named after the town of Needmore.

In popular culture
A fictionalized version of Needmore appeared in the Season 1 finale ("Hiatus") of the NBC comedy program 30 Rock.

The Mommyheads published a song Needmore, Pennsylvania on their album Bingham's Hole released 1995.

References

Census-designated places in Fulton County, Pennsylvania
Census-designated places in Pennsylvania